Lumen Christi High School is a private Roman Catholic high school located in Anchorage Alaska, USA, and is affiliated with the Archdiocese of Anchorage.

History

Lumen Christi Catholic High School was founded in the fall of 1996. It was originally open to grades 7-10, but expanded to 11th in 1997, and 12th in 1998. The school moved from its first building at 750 West Fireweed Lane in 2000 to its current location at 8110 Jewel Lake Road as a ministry of St. Benedict's Parish in Anchorage, Alaska. Lumen is a member of the National Catholic Education Association (NCEA) and is regionally accredited by the Northwest Association of Accredited Schools, through AdvancED. The school  serves 85 students . It has an 11.3:1 student/teacher ratio. The majority of the full-time teaching staff hold master's degrees or higher in their areas of expertise. It is a member of the Alaska School Activities Association for athletics and is classified as 1A school. Lumen Christi's mascot is the Archangel and the school's colors are navy blue and silver.

Principal
Brian Ross is the principal at Lumen Christi.

Campus ministry 
In 2015 Lumen Christi High School added campus ministry to its school life. Campus ministry creates the intentional presence of Catholic faith in active practice.  It seeks to anticipate and provide for the faith needs of high school and middle school students, provide varied opportunities for faith development, and opportunities for school family to grow in faith and community. Among other opportunities, varied prayer, retreat, liturgy preparation, community, and collaborative teams are organized and promoted.

Curriculum 
Lumen is the only Catholic school in Anchorage that is recognized by the state of Alaska as an accredited high school, accredited by the Northwest Accreditation Commission through AdvancED. Lumen Christi does not follow the Common Core Curriculum, which means that Lumen teachers and parents work together to set the curriculum. Furthermore, the curriculum is aligned to the recommendations by the United States Conference of Catholic Bishops.

Extracurricular activities

Athletics

For soccer, volleyball, and basketball, Lumen Christi is a part of the Peninsula Conference, formerly known as Region II, District III. Recognition for the past five years includes:
2013: ASAA 1A High School Boys' Basketball 3rd place State  
2013: ASAA 1A High School Boys' Basketball Region Champions
2012: ASAA 2A High School Boys' Basketball Conference Champions
2012: ASAA 2A High School Boys' Basketball Region Champions
2011: ACSAA Jr. High Volleyball Champions
ASAA 2A High School Volleyball Regions Runner-Up 2010
ACSAA High School Soccer State Champions 2010

Drama

Lumen Christi's  Drama Club produces a comedy in the spring. Previous performances include: 
 2017: "The Hollow"
 2016: The Importance of Being Earnest
 2015: Daddy's Girl
 2014: Spirit
 2013 Cinderella! Cinderella!

Yearbook

Since its opening Lumen Christi has published a yearbook every year.

Archery

Recently Lumen Christi added archery.

See also

Catholic schools in the United States
Higher education
List of high schools in Alaska
Parochial school

Notes and references

External links

1996 establishments in Alaska
Catholic secondary schools in Alaska
Educational institutions established in 1996
High schools in Anchorage, Alaska
Private middle schools in Alaska
Roman Catholic Archdiocese of Anchorage
Schools accredited by the Northwest Accreditation Commission